Tartan Marine (also called Tartan Yachts) is an American boat builder based in Painesville, Ohio near Lake Erie. The company specializes in the design and manufacture of fiberglass sailboats.

The company was founded by Charles Britton in 1971. He started the company as a result of buying out the remains of the Douglass & McLeod after its factory was destroyed by a fire in 1971.

In 2018 the company was producing six designs, the Tartan 5300, Tartan 4700, Tartan 4300, Tartan 4000, Tartan 345 and the Tartan Fantail.

Boats 

Summary of boats built by Tartan:

See also
List of sailboat designers and manufacturers

References

External links

Tartan Marine